The 1973 Holton Tennis Classic – Singles was an event of the 1973 Holton Tennis Classic men's tennis tournament that was played at the Kiel Auditorium in St. Louis, Missouri in the United States from March 26 through April 1, 1973. The draw comprised 36 players and 12 of them were seeded. John Newcombe was the defending champion but did not compete in this edition. Second-seeded Stan Smith won the singles title, defeating first-seeded Rod Laver in the final, 6–4, 3–6, 6–4 and earned $10,000 first-prize money.

Seeds

Draw

Finals

Top half

Bottom half

References

External links
 ITF tournament edition details

Tennis in Missouri
1973 in American tennis